Port of Escape is a 1956 British thriller film directed by Tony Young and starring Googie Withers, John McCallum, Bill Kerr and Joan Hickson.

Plot
Two sailors, one Australian and one American, are kicked off their ship when it docks in London, and get involved in a fight outside a dockside pub that leads to a man's death. They go on the run and hide on a barge that belongs to three women. The two men plan to travel to Missouri, the home state of the American, but not all goes to plan.

Cast
 Googie Withers - Anne Stirling
 John McCallum - Mitchell Gillis
 Bill Kerr - Dinty Missouri
 Joan Hickson - Rosalie Watchett
 Wendy Danielli - Daphne Stirling
 Hugh Pryse - Skinner
 Alexander Gauge - Inspector Levins
 Ingeborg von Kusserow - Lucy
 Ewan Roberts - Sergeant Rutherford
 Basil Dignam as Det. Sgt. Crawford
 George Rose as Publican

Hugh Pryse died in 1955, nine months before the film was released.

Critical reception
In a recent review Allen Eyles at the Radio Times gives the film three out of five stars and writes that "The skilled performances of John McCallum and Googie Withers, and an atmospheric treatment of the London Docks setting, give this modest melodrama a considerable lift. ... An obscure director, Anthony Young, lets the pace slacken occasionally, but overall this is an intelligent and offbeat work that deserves to be better known, and probably owes much to its producer, Lance Comfort, an able director in his own right."

References

External links

1956 films
British crime thriller films
1950s crime thriller films
Films directed by Tony Young
British black-and-white films
Films shot at British National Studios
1950s English-language films
1950s British films